The Hillsboro Sandstone is a geologic formation in Ohio. It dates back to the Devonian.

References
 Generalized Stratigraphic Chart for Ohio

Devonian Ohio